Joyson Safety Systems (JSS), formerly known as Key Safety Systems (KSS) is an American company owned by Chinese investors which develops and manufactures automotive safety systems. The company is a result of KSS purchasing troubled Japanese airbag company Takata Corporation. It is owned jointly by Joyson Group (China) and PAG capital (Hong Kong). The company headquarters is in Auburn Hills, Michigan, United States. Globally, the company has 50,000 employees who work in 32 plants and technical centers worldwide. The current JSS Executive Director and President is Tao Liu.

JSS is owned by Ningbo Joyson Electronic, described as a "Chinese automotive conglomerate" that acquired Key Safety Systems in 2016 for $920 million. The combined sales of both companies are more than $3 billion. Ningbo Joyson Electronic competed against other large companies in the industry including Autoliv and Daicel to acquire Takata.

History

Origins as Breed Automotive Corporation 
JSS was initially founded as Breed Corporation in 1961 by Allen K. Breed as a defense-oriented producer of ammunition components, including mortar fuses. In 1968 Breed Corporation, using their fuse technology developed an electromechanical airbag sensor. The sensor was not widely used until mid-1980s when the United States government had a federal mandate for passive restraint systems. Following Breed Corporation's success in developing the first automotive crash sensor in 1984, the airbag sensor part of the corporation was spun off as its own corporation in 1986 as Breed Automotive Corporation (BAC).

In 1991, the United States Congress decreed that all new cars must be equipped with airbags by 1997. In the same year, BAC changed its name to Breed Technologies, Inc (BTI) and went public on the New York Stock Exchange in November 1992. In 1997, Allen Breed retired as CEO, but continued to serve the company as Chairman Emeritus until his death in December 1999. Breed's wife, Johnnie Breed, would take over as CEO.

Between the years of 1994 and 1998, BTI had spent $1.1 billion (equivalent to $ billion in ) to acquire 11 different companies attempting to expand BTI's influence in the automotive component market. One such acquisition in 1997, was the company called AlliedSignal. AlliedSignal established a major presence in the automotive safety restraint market through its Safety Restraints (SRS) operations. The firm was the only supplier of automotive seatbelts and airbags at the time that had complete vertical operations, from fiber extrusion through finished product. SRS Plant in Knoxville performing all fabric weaving and finishing operations for airbag and seatbelt fabrics while SRS plants in Maryville and Greenville performed the cutting, sewing and final assembly of components. Which were then delivered to customers such as General Motors, Suzuki and Chrysler Corp. among others.

In September 1999, BTI filed for Chapter 11 bankruptcy as a result of the massive debt it took on to acquire those companies, and the fiscal losses it faced in 1998.

Renamed to Key Safety Systems 
In April 2003, BTI was bought by Carlyle Management Group (CMG) for between $300 and $315 million. CMG moved BTI's headquarters from Lakeland, Florida to Sterling Heights, Michigan. In September 2003, CMG announced that BTI would be renamed to Key Safety Systems (KSS). The name change was to show KSS's unification with CMG's other affiliates under the Key Automotive Group brand.

KSS continued to operate under Key Automotive Group until it was acquired by the Chinese-based company, Ningbo Joyson Electronic Corporation (“Joyson Electronics”) in early 2016, for $920 million. The companies’ combined sales worldwide were equal to $3 billion at the time of the purchase.

Takata acquisition 

In June 2017 Takata Corporation, an airbag manufacturer, filed for bankruptcy in the United States and Japan due to lawsuits and large product recalls for unsafe airbags (with faulty airbag inflators) which the company sold to major automotive manufacturers.  KSS acquired the remaining Takata assets for about $1.6 billion.

Renamed to Joyson Safety Systems 
Following the antitrust clearance and bankruptcy court approvals in various countries, on April 11, 2018, KSS announced the completion of its acquisition of Takata, and changed its name to Joyson Safety Systems.

See also 
 Autoliv
 Automobile safety
 Takata Corporation
 Vehicle safety technology
 ZF Friedrichshafen

References

External links 

 Corporate website
 https://www.joyson.cn/
 https://www.joysonsafety.com/

Vehicle safety technologies
Auto parts suppliers of the United States
Chrysler
Ford Motor Company
General Motors
Honda
Mazda
Nissan
Toyota
2003 mergers and acquisitions
2016 mergers and acquisitions
2018 mergers and acquisitions
Multinational companies headquartered in the United States
Multinational companies headquartered in China